Sciota is a genus of snout moths. It was described by George Duryea Hulst in 1888.

Species

Subgenus Clasperopsis Roesler, 1969
Sciota fumella (Eversmann, 1844)
Sciota lucipetella (Jalava, 1978)
Subgenus Sciota Hulst, 1888
Sciota imperialella Ragonot, 1887
Sciota insignella (Mann, 1862)
Sciota ferruginella Zerny, 1914
Sciota rhenella (Zincken, 1818)
Sciota hostilis Stephens, 1834
Subgenus Paranephopterix Roesler, 1969
Sciota adelphella Fischer von Röslerstamm, 1836
Sciota barteli (Caradja, 1910)
Subgenus Denticera Amsel, 1961
Sciota divisella (Duponchel, 1842)

Subgenus unknown

Sciota basilaris (Zeller, 1872)
Sciota biareatella (Caradja, 1925)
Sciota bifasciella (Hulst, 1887)
Sciota bisra (Dyar, 1919)
Sciota carneella (Hulst, 1887)
Sciota celtidella (Hulst, 1890)
Sciota crassifasciella (Ragonot, 1887)
Sciota croceella Hulst, 1888
Sciota cynicella (Christoph, 1881)
Sciota dammersi (Heinrich, 1956)
Sciota delassalis (Hulst, 1886)
Sciota fernaldi (Ragonot, 1887)
Sciota furvicostella (Ragonot, 1893)
Sciota gilvibasella (Hulst, 1890)
Sciota inconditella (Ragonot, 1893)
Sciota marmorata (Alphéraky, 1876)
Sciota obscurella (Caradja in Caradja & Meyrick, 1937)
Sciota rubescentella (Hulst, 1900)
Sciota rubrisparsella (Ragonot, 1887)
Sciota rungsi Leraut, 2002
Sciota subcaesiella (Clemens, 1860)
Sciota subfuscella (Ragonot, 1887)
Sciota termitalis (Hulst, 1886)
Sciota umbrosella (Erschoff, 1877)
Sciota uvinella (Ragonot, 1887)
Sciota vetustella (Dyar, 1904)
Sciota virgatella (Clemens, 1860)

References

Phycitini
Pyralidae genera
Taxa named by George Duryea Hulst